Vranja is a village in the municipality of Lupoglav, in Istria County, Croatia. In 2011, the village had 98 residents.

References

Populated places in Istria County